Serianthes petitiana is a species of flowering plant in the family Fabaceae. It is found only in New Caledonia.

References

petitiana
Endemic flora of New Caledonia
Conservation dependent plants
Taxonomy articles created by Polbot